La Prohibida (in Spanish, The Forbidden Woman), previously "'La Perdida"' (The Lost Woman) is the stage name of Amapola López (born Luis Herrero Cortés, 1971), a Spanish pop and electronic music singer.

Life and career

1971-1996: Early life
Her mother was from Valencia and her father from the Basque Country. She left her parents' home when she was sixteen and was working and studying in several cities such as Barcelona, London, Rio de Janeiro or Rome. She started in the show business in 1996.

Filmography
Manuela, El Cinto (a short film by R. Robles Rafatal, 2001),
La Bastarda - Maria Elisa Valverde (2011) - Villana
Ana La Chica Bolera - Fernanda Carrasco (2012–2013) - Villana
Drag Race España (2022) - Guest judge

Discography 
2001: Alto Standing
2005: Flash
2009: "Sr. Kubrick, ¿Qué haría usted?"
2015: "100k años de luz"
2019: "Ruido"

See also 
 Pabllo Vittar
 Zemmoa

References

External links 

fonoteca.net
MySpace

1971 births
Living people
Spanish people of Basque descent
Spanish pop singers
Spanish drag queens
Spanish vedettes
Spanish LGBT singers
21st-century Spanish singers